Agelasta szetschuanica is a species of beetle in the family Cerambycidae. It was described by Stephan von Breuning in 1967. It is known from Asia.

References

szetschuanica
Beetles described in 1967